The Amazing Bud Powell, Vol. 2 is a studio album by jazz pianist Bud Powell, released on Blue Note Records in 1954, featuring a session Powell recorded with George Duvivier on bass and Art Taylor on drums at the WOR Studios in New York, on August 14, 1953. It was remastered in 2001 by Rudy Van Gelder and reissued as part of Blue Note's RVG Edition series. Prior to this, on all releases bar the first, the album also contained a number of tracks from sessions originally on The Amazing Bud Powell, Vol. 1. The version of the album included on the second disc of The Complete Blue Note and Roost Recordings, a 4 disc box set, is that from the first CD release in 1989.

The Penguin Guide to Jazz Recordings included the album in its suggested “core collection” of essential recordings.

Releases
The album was first released in 1954 as a 10" LP (BLP 5041), including eight master takes from the 1953 session, four of which were also released as 78 rpm singles: "I Want to Be Happy" c/w "The Glass Enclosure" (BN 1628), and "Sure Thing" c/w "Collard Greens and Black-Eye Peas" (BN 1629).

In May 1956, the album was re-issued as a 12" LP (BLP 1504) with four additional tracks. Said release initiated the mixing of the 1953 session with two sessions (from 1949 and 1951) originally on The Amazing Bud Powell, Vol. 1. The first digital remastering dates back to 1985, when the album was re-issued on vinyl and cassette, and kept the LP track listing.

In 1989, the album was digitally remastered and released on CD with the tracks listed in session chronological order, leaving five tracks from the 1951 session on the volume.

In 2001, Rudy Van Gelder remastered the album from scratch, and the album was re-issued as part of Blue Note's RVG Edition series. This release re-instated the volume as just containing the 1953 session (this time in full), moving all 1951 material back to The Amazing Bud Powell, Vol. 1, and adding "I've Got You Under My Skin", two alternate takes of "Autumn in New York", an alternate take of "Sure Thing" and an extra alternate take of "Reets and I". The track listing was changed to group the alternate takes after the master takes.

Track listing 
Except where otherwise noted, all songs composed by Bud Powell.

1954 10" LP (BLP 5041) 
 "Autumn in New York" (Vernon Duke) – 2:54
 "Reets and I" (Benny Harris) – 3:22
 "Sure Thing" – 2:39
 "Collard Greens and Black-Eyed Peas" (aka "Blues in the Closet") (Oscar Pettiford) – 3:04
 "Polka Dots and Moonbeams" (Jimmy Van Heusen, Johnny Burke) – 4:04
 "I Want to Be Happy" (Vincent Youmans, Irving Caesar) – 2:53
 "Audrey" – 2:58
 "Glass Enclosure" (aka "The Glass Enclosure") – 2:25

1956 12" LP (BLP 1504) 
 "Reets and I" (Harris) – 3:18
 "Autumn in New York" (Duke) – 2:51
 "I Want to Be Happy" (Youmans, Caesar) – 2:50
 "It Could Happen to You" (Van Heusen, Burke) – 3:13 (1951 session)
 "Sure Thing" – 2:39
 "Polka Dots and Moonbeams" (Van Heusen, Burke) – 4:00
 "Glass Enclosure" – 2:21
 "Collard Greens and Black-Eyed Peas" (Pettiford) – 3:01
 "Over the Rainbow" (Harold Arlen, E.Y. "Yip" Harburg) – 2:57 (1951 session)
 "Audrey" – 2:54
 "You Go to My Head" (J. Fred Coots, Haven Gillespie) – 3:15 (1949 session)
 "Ornithology" (alternate take) (Benny Harris, Charlie Parker) – 3:11 (1949 session)

1989 CD 
 "A Night in Tunisia" (Dizzy Gillespie, Frank Paparelli) – 4:16 (1951 session)
 "A Night in Tunisia" (alternate take) (Gillespie, Paparelli) – 3:52 (1951 session)
 "It Could Happen to You" (alternate take) (Van Heusen, Burke) – 2:22 (1951 session)
 "It Could Happen to You" (Van Heusen, Burke) – 3:16 (1951 session)
 "Parisian Thoroughfare" – 3:25 (1951 session)
 "Autumn in New York" (Duke) – 2:51
 "Reets and I" (Harris) – 3:18
 "Reets and I" (alternate take) – 2:30
 "Sure Thing" – 2:39
 "Collard Greens and Black-Eyed Peas" (alternate take) – 2:11
 "Collard Greens and Black-Eyed Peas" (Pettiford) – 3:01
 "Polka Dots and Moonbeams" (Van Heusen, Burke) – 4:00
 "I Want to Be Happy" (Youmans, Caesar) – 2:50
 "Audrey" – 2:54
 "Glass Enclosure" – 2:21

2001 RVG Edition 
 "Autumn in New York" (Duke) – 2:54
 "Reets and I" (Harris) – 3:22
 "Sure Thing" – 2:40
 "Collard Greens and Black-Eyed Peas" (Pettiford) – 3:04
 "Polka Dots and Moonbeams" (Van Heusen, Burke) – 4:04
 "I Want to Be Happy" (Youmans, Caesar) – 2:53
 "Audrey" – 2:58
 "Glass Enclosure" – 2:25
 "I've Got You Under My Skin" (Cole Porter) – 2:37
 "Autumn in New York" (alternate take #1) – 2:13
 "Autumn in New York" (alternate take #2) – 2:58
 "Reets and I" (alternate take #1) – 2:33
 "Reets and I" (alternate take #2) – 3:13
 "Sure Thing" (alternate take) – 2:45
 "Collard Greens and Black-Eyed Peas" (alternate take) – 2:11

Personnel

Performance 
 Bud Powell – piano
 George Duvivier – bass
 Art Taylor – drums
On Ornithology and You Go to My Head Performers are:
 Bud Powell – piano
 Tommy Potter –  bass
 Roy Haynes – drums

Production 
 Alfred Lion – original session producer
 Michael Cuscuna – re-release producer
 Doug Hawkins – recording engineer
 Rudy Van Gelder – mastering
 Leonard Feather – liner notes (LP and 1989 CD)
 Bob Blumenthal – liner notes
 Francis Wolff – original cover photography
 John Hermansader – cover design

References 

 Blue Note BLP 5041, BLP 1504
 Bud Powell at jazzdisco.org
 The Amazing Bud Powell, Vol. 2 at BlueNote.com

External links 
 NPR Basic Jazz Record Library entry, with audio samples.

Bud Powell albums
1954 albums
Albums produced by Alfred Lion
Blue Note Records albums
Albums produced by Michael Cuscuna
Sequel albums